"Ulrikke" (original Spanish title: "Ulrica") is a short story by Argentinian writer Jorge Luis Borges, collected in the anthology The Book of Sand. It is notable because it is one of the few of Borges' stories in which women and sex play a central role. The story begins with an epigraph quoting a verse of Chapter 27 of Volsunga saga, "Hann tekr sverðit Gram ok leggr i meðal þeira bert", which means: "He takes the sword Gram and lays it bare between them". The short story is about a meeting between Ulrica, a Norwegian woman, and a Colombian teacher, Javier Otárola (who tells the story), in York. In this meeting, the couple falls in love with each other and takes possession of the names of the heroes of the legendary saga contained in the epigraph: Brynhild and Sigurd, respectively.  

 Both the epigraph and the name of the protagonists are inscripted in Borges's grave, in Geneva.

Short stories by Jorge Luis Borges
1975 short stories